Dorothy is the third studio album by English band Diagrams. It was released on 12 May 2017 through Bookshop Records. The album was produced by Kristofer Harris and Mike Lindsay.

The band's lead vocalist Sam Genders set up a crowdfunding page on Indiegogo to release the album in collaboration with poet Dorothy Trogdon. It raised .

Track listing

References

2017 albums